The Mayor of Stoke-on-Trent was an executive mayoralty that existed from 2002 to 2009, when the executive of Stoke-on-Trent City Council was a directly elected mayor. The authority was unique in being the only authority in England with an elected mayor and council manager.  The first mayor was Mike Wolfe, a former manager of the Citizen's Advice Bureau in the city.  He had stood as an independent, but was defeated by Mark Meredith representing the Labour Party in 2005.  A referendum was held on 24 October 2008.  Residents voted in favour of a return to the council leader and cabinet system.  There was controversy when it was revealed three years later that plans to close a swimming pool in the city had been agreed privately by the former mayor.

Referendum

2002

2008

2002

2005

List of mayors
Mike Wolfe (2002 to 2005)
Mark Meredith (2005 to 2009)

References

Stoke-on-Trent

Stoke-on-Trent